Mangalasasanam refers to a Vaishnava concept in Hinduism, where a devotee offers their salutations and felicitations upon God due to a profound sense of concern for the latter, and also as an exercise of forgetting their sense of self.

Hymns

The concept of mangalasasanam is often associated with the pasurams (verses) of the Alvars, who during the early medieval period of Tamil history (between the 7th and 10th centuries CE), worshipped Vishnu and his avatars through their hymns. This collection of their hymns is known as the Naalayira Divya Prabhandham. The Sri Vaishnava shrines that were extolled by the Alvars are called the Divya Desams, where a number of these poet-saints offered their mangalasasanam.

Classification

The below table provides a classification for the mangalasananams offered by the Alvars:

Gallery

Some of the famous Divya Desams the mangalasanams were uttered include the following temples:

Notes

References
 
 
 
 
 

Hindu texts